Athletes from Iran competed at the 1998 Winter Olympics in Nagano, Japan.  It had been 22 years since the previous time that Iran had competed at the Winter Games. One athlete and three officials represented Iran in the 1998 Olympics.

Competitors

Results by event

Skiing

Alpine

Men

References

External links 
 Official Olympic Reports

Nations at the 1998 Winter Olympics
1998
Winter Olympics